The Satellite Award for Outstanding Mobile Game is an annual award given by the International Press Academy as one of its Satellite Awards.

Winners and nominees

References

External links
 International Press Academy website

Mobile Game